Víctor Manuel Ngabo Nsi (born Víctor Manuel Manguire Ntongono, 23 July 1989), commonly known as Michi, is a retired Equatoguinean footballer who plays as a central or defensive midfielder.

International career
In July 2010, Michi received his unique call for the Equatoguinean senior team and to play a friendly match against Morocco on 11 August 2010. Michi was substitute and replaced Kily in the 85th minute.

References

External links

1989 births
Living people
People from Bata, Equatorial Guinea
Equatoguinean footballers
Association football midfielders
UD Almería B players
Divisiones Regionales de Fútbol players
Equatorial Guinea international footballers
Equatoguinean expatriate footballers
Equatoguinean expatriate sportspeople in Spain
Expatriate footballers in Spain